Carlos Casares Partido is a partido of Buenos Aires Province in Argentina.

Settlements
Carlos Casares

Algarrobos, Buenos Aires

Centenario
Arias

Mauricio Hirsch

External links
Portal de Carlos Casares
Spanish Wikipedia entry for Carlos Casares Partido

1907 establishments in Argentina
Partidos of Buenos Aires Province
Populated places established in 1907